Brett Valenciano Wiesner (May 12, 1983 – July 5, 2014) was an American soccer player.

He spent his career with the Seattle Sounders in the USL First Division, the Harrisburg City Islanders in the USL Second Division and also played indoor soccer with Milwaukee Wave.

Wiesner also played on several US Youth National Teams, and was a starter for the Americans in the 2008 FIFA Futsal World Cup in Brasil.

Wiesner drowned in Oconomowoc Lake while swimming with friends early in the morning on July 5, 2014.

References

External links
Washington Huskies bio

1983 births
2014 deaths
American soccer players
Washington Huskies men's soccer players
Seattle Sounders (1994–2008) players
Milwaukee Wave players
Penn FC players
Association football forwards
Soccer players from Minnesota
USL First Division players
Major Indoor Soccer League (2001–2008) players
USL Second Division players
Major Indoor Soccer League (2008–2014) players
United States men's under-20 international soccer players
Deaths by drowning in the United States
Accidental deaths in Wisconsin
American men's futsal players
People from St. Louis Park, Minnesota
Sportspeople from the Minneapolis–Saint Paul metropolitan area